Shangla is a district of Khyber Pakhtunkhwa, Pakistan.

Shangla may also refer to:

Shangla Pass, a linking road in Pakistan

See also
 Shang-a-Lang (disambiguation)
 Shangri-La (disambiguation)